Rendelsham is a town in the south-east of South Australia,  south east of the state capital, Adelaide. It is on the Southern Ports Highway between Beachport and Millicent.

Rendelsham was also on the narrow-gauge railway between Beachport and Mount Gambier from its opening in 1878 until 1957. When part of the line was converted to broad gauge, the part between Millicent and Beachport was decommissioned instead of converted, removing railway service from Rendelsham.

Rendelsham is located within the federal division of Barker, the state Electoral district of MacKillop and the local government area of the Wattle Range Council.

References

Towns in South Australia
Limestone Coast